Downtown Sounds is an album by jazz tenor saxophonist Grant Stewart.

Background
This was Stewart's first album as leader.

Music and recording
The album was recorded on December 27, 1992, in New York City. Stewart was 21 at the time.

Reception
The Penguin Guide to Jazz described it as "tough-tender hard bop, played with intelligence and resolutely unsurprising."

Track listing
"Audobahn" (Sonny Rollins) – 5:20
"Smada" (Billy Strayhorn) – 7:53
"Daydream" (Strayhorn, Duke Ellington, John La Touche) – 7:36
"From This Moment On" (Cole Porter) – 7:00
"A Bee Has Two Brains" (Johnny Ellis) – 8:03
"Sweet and Lovely" (Gus Arnheim, Harry Tobias, Jules Lemare) – 8:06
"Intimacy of the Blues" (Strayhorn) – 7:48
"Ko-Ko" (Charlie Parker) – 8:08

Personnel
 Grant Stewart – tenor sax
 Joe Magnarelli – trumpet
 Brad Mehldau – piano
 Peter Washington – bass
 Kenny Washington – drums

References

1994 albums
Grant Stewart albums
Criss Cross Jazz albums